WBBN (95.9 FM, "B-95") is a radio station licensed to the community of Taylorsville, Mississippi, and serving the Laurel-Hattiesburg area.  The station is owned by Blakeney Communications, Inc. It airs a country music format.

The station was assigned the WBBN call letters by the Federal Communications Commission on August 22, 1984.

History
WBBN began in a mobile home near Hebron, Mississippi, in 1985 as an automated-assist station (automated equipment with live personalities) and it has built a reputation for the "most accurate news reporting" of all radio stations in the market.  The station has since expanded to a more permanent structure, following its success against other competing country stations.  B-95 is an ABC Radio affiliate, broadcasting Paul Harvey news and commentary six days a week.  B-95 is owned by Blakeney Communications, Inc.

References

External links

BBN
Country radio stations in the United States
Radio stations established in 1985
1985 establishments in Mississippi